Yo quiero bailar (Spanish, 'I want to dance') may refer to:

 Yo quiero bailar (album), by Sonia & Selena, 2001
 "Yo quiero bailar" (song), 2001
Yo Queiro Bailar, a 2004 album by Tadros
Yo queiro bailar, a 2006 album by Los Sultanes

See also
 "Yo También Quiero Bailar", a 1982 single by Gloria Estefan
 Quiero Bailar, a Spanish TV dance talent show 
 "Quiero Bailar" (song), by Ivy Queen, 2003